The 2019–20 NBL season was the 34th season for the Brisbane Bullets in the NBL, and the 4th since their return to the league.

Roster

Depth chart

Preseason 
As part of their pre-season, the Bullets played five pre-season games. Their first game were held in Brisbane against the Creighton Bluejays, with the next two games being held in Melbourne against the South East Melbourne Phoenix and Melbourne United. After that they played two games in Cairns against the Cairns Taipans, and as a club in the NBL they also took part in the NBL Blitz where they played games against the Adelaide 36ers and the NBL1 All-Stars. They rounded off their pre-season on the Sunshine Coast against the Perth Wildcats, and they opted out of the NBLxNBA games.

Ladder

Game log 

|- style="background-color:#ffcccc;"
| 1
| 13 August
| Creighton Bluejays
| L 79 - 107
| Not announced
| Not announced
| Not announced
| NAB Stadium 
| 0-1
|- style="background-color:#ffcccc;"
| 2
| 6 September
| @ South East Melbourne Phoenix
| L 85-80
| Lamar Patterson (19)
| Lamar Patterson (7)
| Jason Cadee, Tamuri Wigness (3)
| Traralgon Sports Stadium
| 0-2
|- style="background-color:#ccffcc;"
| 3
| 8 September
| @ Melbourne United
| W 80-102
| Taylor Braun (22)
| Will Magnay, E. J. Singler (7)
| Lamar Patterson (6)
| Melbourne Sports and Aquatic Centre
| 1-2
|- style="background-color:#ffcccc;"
| 4
| 13 September
| @ Cairns Taipans
| L 104-66
| E. J. Singler (10)
| Will Magnay (6)
| E. J. Singler (4)
| Early Settler Stadium
| 1-3
|- style="background-color:#ffcccc;"
| 5
| 15 September
| @ Cairns Taipans
| L 76-66
| Lamar Patterson (21)
| Will Magnay (7)
| Jason Cadee (8)
| Early Settler Stadium
| 1-4

|- style="background-color:#ccffcc;"
| 1
| 19 September
| NBL1 All-Stars
| W 106-57
| E. J. Singler (19)
| Taylor Braun (8)
| Lamar Patterson (10)
| Ulverstone Sports & Leisure Centre
| 1-0
|- style="background-color:#ccffcc;"
| 2
| 21 September
| Adelaide 36ers
| W 85-92
| Lamar Patterson (20)
| Matt Hodgson (7)
| Lamar Patterson (8)
| Silverdome
| 2-0

|- style="background-color:#ccffcc;"
| 6
| 27 September
| Perth Wildcats
| W 85-82
| Lamar Patterson (26)
| Tyrell Harrison (6)
| Nathan Sobey (7)
| University of the Sunshine Coast
| 2-4

Regular season 
The regular season of the NBL consisted of 28 games, with the Bullet's 14 home games played at Nissan Arena after moving from the Brisbane Convention & Exhibition Centre and the Brisbane Entertainment Centre during the off-season.

Ladder

Game log

|- style="background-color:#ccffcc;"
| 1
| 6 October
| @ Illawarra Hawks
| W 81-90
| Lamar Patterson (25)
| Cameron Gliddon (9)
| Taylor Braun (6)
| WIN Entertainment Centre 
| 1-0
|- style="background-color:#ccffcc;"
| 2
| 11 October
| Cairns Taipans
| W 90-74
| Nathan Sobey (21)
| Lamar Patterson (6)
| Braun, Patterson, Sobey (5)
| Nissan Arena
| 2-0
|- style="background-color:#ffcccc;"
| 3
| 13 October
| @ South East Melbourne Phoenix
| L 113-93
| Lamar Patterson (30)
| Taylor Braun, Nathan Sobey (6)
| Nathan Sobey (7)
| Melbourne Arena
| 2-1
|- style="background-color:#ffcccc;"
| 4
| 19 October
| @ Adelaide 36ers
| L 104-98
| Lamar Patterson (21)
| Taylor Braun, Hodgson (5)
| Lamar Patterson (6)
| Adelaide Entertainment Centre
| 2-2
|- style="background-color:#ffcccc;"
| 5
| 26 October
| @ Sydney Kings
| L 94-79
| Nathan Sobey (21)
| Taylor Braun (5)
| Braun, Hodgson, Patterson (3)
| Qudos Bank Arena 
| 2-3

|- style="background-color:#ccffcc;"
| 6
| 1 November
| Perth Wildcats
| W 87-78
| Jason Cadee (17)
| Lamar Patterson, Nathan Sobey (7)
| Jason Cadee (5)
| Nissan Arena 
| 3-3
|- style="background-color:#ccffcc;"
| 7
| 3 November
| @ Illawarra Hawks
| W 69-83
| Nathan Sobey (18)
| Matt Hodgson (9)
| Lamar Patterson (7)
| AIS Arena
| 4-3
|- style="background-color:#ffcccc;"
| 8
| 8 November
| Sydney Kings
| L 85-95
| Lamar Patterson (22)
| Lamar Patterson (11)
| Lamar Patterson (7)
| Nissan Arena
| 4-4
|- style="background-color:#ffcccc;"
| 9
| 16 November
| @ Cairns Taipans
| L 94-85
| Nathan Sobey (20)
| Matt Hodgson (9)
| Nathan Sobey (7)
| Cairns Convention Centre
| 4-5
|- style="background-color:#ccffcc;"
| 10
| 22 November
| Adelaide 36ers
| W 106-104
| Lamar Patterson (27)
| Lamar Patterson (6)
| E. J. Singler (6)
| Nissan Arena
| 5-5
|- style="background-color:#ffcccc;"
| 11
| 24 November
| @ Melbourne United
| L 108-94
| Jason Cadee (18)
| Matt Hodgson, Lamar Patterson (7)
| Lamar Patterson (8)
| Melbourne Arena 
| 5-6
|- style="background-color:#ffcccc;"
| 12
| 30 November
| South East Melbourne Phoenix
| L 95-110
| Jason Cadee (15)
| Will Magnay (7)
| Lamar Patterson (8)
| Nissan Arena
| 5-7

|- style="background-color:#ccffcc;"
| 13
| 7 December
| Illawarra Hawks
| W 101-91
| Lamar Patterson (19)
| Matt Hodgson (9)
| Lamar Patterson (6)
| Nissan Arena
| 6-7
|- style="background-color:#ffcccc;"
| 14
| 9 December
| @ New Zealand Breakers
| L 96-85
| Lamar Patterson (36)
| Matt Hodgson (9)
| Lamar Patterson (6)
| Spark Arena
| 6-8
|- style="background-color:#ffcccc;"
| 15
| 14 December
| @ Perth Wildcats
| L 86-78
| Nathan Sobey (15)
| Matt Hodgson, Lamar Patterson (8)
| Jason Cadee (4)
| RAC Arena 
| 6-9
|- style="background-color:#ccffcc;"
| 16
| 21 December
| Sydney Kings
| W 87-80
| Will Magnay (23)
| Will Magnay (14)
| E. J. Singler (6)
| Nissan Arena
| 7-9
|- style="background-color:#ffcccc;"
| 17
| 27 December
| New Zealand Breakers
| L 96-99
| Nathan Sobey (29)
| Lamar Patterson (9)
| Lamar Patterson (8)
| Nissan Arena
| 7-10
|- style="background-color:#ccffcc;"
| 18
| 29 December
| @ Melbourne United
| W 96-102
| Lamar Patterson (35)
| Matt Hodgson (11)
| Cameron Gliddon (4)
| Melbourne Arena
| 8-10

|- style="background-color:#ffcccc;"
| 19
| 3 January
| @ Cairns Taipans
| L 91-89
| E. J. Singler (20)
| Will Magnay (8)
| Lamar Patterson (6)
| Cairns Convention Centre 
| 8-11
|- style="background-color:#ccffcc;"
| 20
| 5 January
| Perth Wildcats
| 97-85
| Lamar Patterson (35)
| Will Magnay (9)
| Lamar Patterson, Nathan Sobey (4)
| Nissan Arena
| 9-11
|- style="background-color:#ccffcc;"
| 21
| 12 January
| @ New Zealand Breakers
| W 85-95
| Lamar Patterson (18)
| Matt Hodgson (10)
| Lamar Patterson, Nathan Sobey (5)
| Spark Arena
| 10-11
|- style="background-color:#ccffcc;"
| 22
| 18 January
| Illawarra Hawks
| W 106-77
| Lamar Patterson (20)
| Lamar Patterson (9)
| Jason Cadee (6)
| Nissan Arena
| 11-11
|- style="background-color:#ccffcc;"
| 23
| 23 January
| South East Melbourne Phoenix
| W 108-101
| Lamar Patterson (27)
| E. J. Singler (9)
| Cameron Gliddon (6)
| Nissan Arena
| 12-11
|- style="background-color:#ccffcc;"
| 24
| 25 January
| @ Adelaide 36ers
| W 99-108
| Lamar Patterson (29)
| Matt Hodgson (12)
| Nathan Sobey (6)
| Adelaide Entertainment Centre
| 13-11

|- style="background-color:#ccffcc;"
| 25
| 1 February
| Melbourne United
| W 87-83
| Lamar Patterson (31)
| Matt Hodgson (14)
| Lamar Patterson (5)
| Nissan Arena
| 14-11
|- style="background-color:#ffcccc;"
| 26
| 7 February
| New Zealand Breakers
| L 87-91
| Nathan Sobey (30)
| Will Magnay (11)
| Nathan Sobey (3)
| Nissan Arena
| 14-12
|- style="background-color:#ffcccc;"
| 27
| 9 February
| @ Perth Wildcats
| L 85-72
| Lamar Patterson (25)
| Lamar Patterson (11)
| Taylor Braun, Lamar Patterson (3)
| RAC Arena 
| 14-13
|- style="background-color:#ccffcc;"
| 28
| 15 February
| Cairns Taipans
| W 124-88
| Nathan Sobey (30)
| Matt Hodgson, E. J. Singler (9)
| E. J. Singler, Nathan Sobey (6)
| Nissan Arena
| 15-13

Awards

Player of the Week 
Round 5, Jason Cadee

Round 13, Lamar Patterson

See also 

 2019–20 NBL season
 Brisbane Bullets

References

External links 

 Official Website 

Brisbane Bullets season
Brisbane Bullets seasons
Brisbane Bullets season
Brisbane Bullets